Jelly Belly Candy Company, formerly known as Herman Goelitz Candy Company and Goelitz Confectionery Company, is an American company that manufactures Jelly Belly jelly beans and other candy. 

The company is based in Fairfield, California, with a second manufacturing facility in North Chicago, Illinois.  A distribution and visitor center in Pleasant Prairie, Wisconsin, began liquidation and closure on August 3, 2020. In October 2008, the company opened a  manufacturing plant in Rayong, Thailand, where it produces confections for the international market.

History

1866–1913
Gustav Goelitz came to the United States in 1866 from Germany and in 1869 started the confectionery business Gustav Goelitz in Belleville, Illinois. His younger brothers, Albert and George, emigrated to America soon after joining him in the business.
In 1898, the company began manufacturing mellowcreme candies (also called mellow cream, and butter cream). Candy corn, a type of mellowcreme candy, was likely developed by George Renniger, an employee of Wunderlee Candy Company in Philadelphia.  The Goelitz Confectionery Company was successful in selling a variety of mellowcreme candy including candy corn. In 1904, the company relocated to Chicago and later to North Chicago in 1913.

1913–1980
Herman Goelitz, the son of Gustav, moved to the West Coast to start his own business, Herman Goelitz Candy Company. The company eventually settled in Oakland, California in 1924. In the 1960s, the company began to expand the product line to include  jelly beans, various jells, and other confections. "One of those new products was a small and very flavorful Mini Jelly Bean [developed in 1965]." The Mini Jelly Bean center had natural flavoring and the inside and outer shell was flavored, which was innovative for the time.

Ronald Reagan first tried the Mini Jelly Beans in 1966. "The then California governor had quit smoking years before and turned to popping candy as a...substitute." Reagan wrote to Herman Rowland Sr. while governor, "It's gotten to the point...where we can hardly start a meeting or make a decision without passing around a jar of jelly beans. We owe you a special measure of thanks for helping keep our state government running smoothly."

In 1976, David Klein, a candy and nut distributor, collaborated with Herman Rowland, president of Herman Goelitz to create a jelly bean using natural purees. David Klein hired the Goelitz company as his contract manufacturer for the jelly beans. Using the Mini Jelly Bean concept, the Jelly Belly jelly bean was created. Klein coined the name "Jelly Belly" as a tribute to blues musician Lead Belly, and was responsible for the design of the product's famous red and yellow trademark.

Klein sold the first Jelly Belly jelly beans in 1976 at an ice cream parlor called Fosselman's in Alhambra, California. The first flavors were Very Cherry, Tangerine, Lemon, Green Apple, Grape, Licorice, Root Beer, and Cream Soda. It was David Klein's idea "to sell them as separate flavors instead of a variety pack...".

1980–present
Marinus van Dam, product developer and plant manager for the company, oversaw the development of Jelly Belly jelly beans. By the 1980s, many flavors had been developed. In 1980, Klein sold the Jelly Belly trademark. "David Klein sold the Jelly Belly trademark to Rowland for $4.8 million, paid in monthly installments over 20 years, which Klein split with a partner." The Jelly Belly trademark was registered August 3, 1982. The Mr. Jelly Belly character was developed in 1983. Prior to the development of the character David Klein called himself "Mr. Jelly Belly." 

The general public became aware of President Ronald Reagan's preference for Jelly Belly jelly beans in 1981. The company supplied Reagan with Jelly Belly jelly beans during his eight years of presidency. Chairman Rowland recalls, "We were thrilled by press reports that President Reagan gave jars of Jelly Belly jelly beans to visiting dignitaries." (Reagan, however, "started to favor M&M's as the official White House candy during his eighth and final year in office.") Reagan made them the first jelly beans in space, sending them on the Space Shuttle Challenger during the STS-7 mission in 1983, surprising the astronauts.

In 2001, the company renamed itself to Jelly Belly Candy Company.

Recently, Jelly Belly Candy Company countersued David Klein in federal court for falsely claiming to be the founder of the company.

Products

Jelly beans 
The company's signature product, the Jelly Belly jelly bean, comes in more than 50 varieties ranging from traditional flavors like orange, lemon lime, and very cherry, to more exotic ones like cinnamon, pomegranate, cappuccino, buttered popcorn, and chili-mango.

Jelly Belly Candy Company manufactures numerous specialty Jelly Belly jelly beans with licensed products like Tabasco sauce and uncommon candy tastes like egg nog and pancakes with maple syrup. A few flavors such as lychee and green tea, are sold only in markets outside the United States.

Several flavors have been based on popular alcoholic beverages, beginning with Mai Tai in 1977. Over the years, new additions have included strawberry daiquiri, margarita, mojito, and piña colada. Draft beer, a flavor inspired by Hefeweizen ale, was introduced in 2014. All flavors are entirely alcohol-free.

"Bertie Bott's Every Flavour Beans" were inspired by the Harry Potter book series and featured intentionally gruesome flavors such as "Vomit", "Earwax", "Skunk Spray",  "Rotten Egg" and "Grass". A similar product dubbed "BeanBoozled" pairs lookalike "normal" flavors with weird flavors, such as "Peach" and "Barf".

"Sport Beans" are jelly beans designed to provide physical energy and enhance athletic performance. They contain carbohydrates, electrolytes (in the form of sodium and potassium), and vitamins B1, B2, B3 and C. "Extreme Sport Beans" include the additional boost of caffeine.

Other candies 
The company makes over 100 different confections including chocolates, licorice, gummies, and candy corn.

Facilities

The company operates three manufacturing plants in Fairfield, California; North Chicago, Illinois; and  Rayong, Thailand. A fourth facility in Pleasant Prairie, Wisconsin, was a distribution center and a visitor center until liquidation began on August 3, 2020; it closed.

Gallery

Jelly Belly Candy Company factory in Fairfield, California

References

External links 

   
 David Klein on the development of the Jelly Belly® jelly bean: 
 
 

Brand name confectionery
Companies based in Solano County, California
Fairfield, California
Food and drink in the San Francisco Bay Area
Food and drink companies established in 1869
1869 establishments in Illinois
Candy
Manufacturing companies based in the San Francisco Bay Area
Confectionery companies based in California